Everybody's Talking About Jamie is a coming-of-age stage musical with music by Dan Gillespie Sells and book and lyrics by Tom MacRae. The musical is inspired by the 2011 British television documentary Jamie: Drag Queen at 16 directed by Jenny Popplewell. The musical follows and is based upon the true-life story of 16-year-old British schoolboy Jamie Campbell, as he overcomes prejudice and bullying to step out of the darkness and become a drag queen.

Plot

Act One 
Miss Hedge, a careers teacher, asks her noisy year eleven class what they want to be when they get older. One student of the class (16), Jamie New, gets teased about his homosexuality and reveals to the audience all he wants to be is a drag queen ("And You Don't Even Know It"). When prompted, Jamie tells the class he wants to be a performer, but Miss Hedge tells him to get real.

At Jamie's house, his mum Margaret and family friend Ray are preparing for his sixteenth birthday. When Jamie arrives home, Margaret gives him a card from his dad, with a picture of a race car. Margaret then gives Jamie his gift from her - a pair of red high heels from Meadowhall. Jamie reveals hesitation about going outside his garden in the shoes ("Wall in My Head").

The next day at school, Jamie shows his best friend Pritti his new heels, and then he is interrupted by Dean, the school bully. He taunts Pritti for being Muslim, and Jamie for being gay. Jamie taunts Dean for his small penis in return. Embarrassed, Dean leaves. Pritti encourages Jamie to go to prom in a dress ("Spotlight"). Jamie then parades around the classroom in his heels ("Spotlight (Reprise) (Star of the Show)").

At his local shop for drag queen attire, Victor's Secret, Jamie befriends the owner Hugo, and learns all about Hugo's past as a drag queen ("The Legend of Loco Chanelle (and the Blood Red Dress)"). Hugo books Jamie's first drag show at the local nightclub, and helps Jamie choose his dress ("The Legend of Loco Chanelle (and the Blood Red Dress) (Reprise)").

Meanwhile, Margaret meets with Jamie's dad, where she reveals she has been lying to Jamie about the activity of his dad, including the fact she has to write a birthday card from him each birthday. Jamie's dad tells Margaret he wants nothing to do with Jamie, claiming he is not a "real boy". Margaret ponders what her life would be like if she never met Jamie's dad ("If I Met Myself Again").

At school, Jamie pulls Pritti into a disabled toilet so she can help with his make-up. They are discovered by Miss Hedge, but Pritti tells her that she is doing Jamie's make-up for an art project. Miss Hedge tells Jamie that he should be proud of being an art project, and walks him around school in the make-up. Jamie, initially embarrassed by the attention, decides to be proud of himself, telling the school that he is doing a drag show at the local nightclub, Legs Eleven, that night ("Work of Art").

Outside Legs Eleven, Jamie bumps into Dean, who calls him a minger. Inside the club, Margaret and Ray have been introduced to a group of drag queens: Laika Virgin, Tray Sophisticay, and Sandra Bollock. Hugo emerges, now dressed as Loco Chanelle, his drag alter-ego. Jamie runs in to tell them all he cannot go on because of what Dean said. Jamie finds the dress he admired at Victor's Secret in his dressing room, with a tag on saying "Love Dad" as well as a flower delivery from Jamie's dad. Loco Chanelle, with the help of the other drag queens, encourage Jamie to find his drag self, whom Jamie calls Mimi Me, and get him ready and push him onstage ("Over the Top")

Act Two 
The next day, the school is buzzing with news of Jamie's drag debut ("Everybody's Talking About Jamie"). Jamie comes into school in bright blue eyeshadow and long eyelashes. Miss Hedge once again tells Jamie to "get real", and Dean taunts Jamie, but Jamie kisses him in retaliation, leaving Dean confused.

At home, Jamie shows Margaret and Ray his new prom dress, now shortened and fitted with working flashing lights. Margaret worries if this is all too much ("Limited Edition Prom Night Special"). The phone rings, and Jamie and Margaret are called to the school.

Jamie, Margaret and Ray go to the school to meet with Miss Hedge, who tells Jamie that there have been rumours that he will be attending prom in drag, and she will not allow it. Jamie is disappointed, and Dean seems to know all about it.

In Pritti's bedroom, Jamie rants to Pritti about how he is not allowed to go to prom in drag. Pritti tells Jamie to go in a dress - not in drag. Jamie says that without Mimi Me, he is ugly. Pritti reassures Jamie that he is far from ugly ("It Means Beautiful"). Jamie reveals that when he was eight, his dad found him in a dress and was angry. He is then confused as to why he paid for the dress and bought flowers if he is not supportive of him as a drag queen. Pritti suggests Jamie should go to his house and speak to him. Before he leaves, Jamie kisses Pritti on the cheek ("It Means Beautiful (Reprise)").

At the house of Jamie's dad, Jamie's dad reveals that he did not know about Mimi Me and calls Jamie disgusting. He tells Jamie he did not pay for the dress or flowers. Jamie figures out that it was his mother doing all of this in his dad's place ("Ugly in This Ugly World").

At home, Jamie argues with Margaret over why she has been lying over all these years. Jamie screams in Margaret's face and storms out. Margaret, left alone, sings about how she will always love Jamie no matter what ("He's My Boy").

Jamie wanders the streets drunk on cider. He is approached by three local boys, and is beaten up as they shout homophobic remarks about him. ("And You Don't Even Know It (Bus Station Reprise)"). Jamie is defended by Hugo, who urges Jamie to go home and apologise to his mum.

Jamie takes Hugo's advice and Margaret and Jamie apologise to each other ("My Man, Your Boy").

At the prom, all of the kids are super excited ("Prom Song"). Pritti enters, wearing makeup and a prom dress. All the girls love it, but Dean decides to bully her. She finally stands up to Dean, and then reveals Jamie, in a white prom dress. Miss Hedge comes out of the school and refuses Jamie's admission to the prom. All the kids stand outside and chant Jamie's name until Miss Hedge gives in and lets him in. Jamie waits until everyone's gone in, and then calls Dean out from off-stage. Jamie encourages Dean to be nice just for one night, to which Dean agrees, and they walk into prom hand-in-hand ("Finale").

As an encore, the cast perform "Out of the Darkness (A Place Where We Belong)".

Roles and principal casts 

†The character Leigh in the Sheffield production was renamed Ray for the West End transfer.

The character of Wayne New is not given a name in the stage production; an artistic decision was made to credit actors as ‘Jamie’s Dad’.

Notable West End replacements 
Jamie: Layton Williams
Ray: Shobna Gulati
 Hugo: Lee Ross, Shane Richie, Bianca Del Rio, Bill Ward, Rufus Hound
 Miss Hedge: Michelle Visage, Hayley Tamaddon, Faye Tozer, Rita Simons, Preeya Kalidas, Katy Brand

Musical numbers 

Act One
 "And You Don't Even Know It" – Jamie, Miss Hedge & Year 11
 "And You Don't Even Know It Tag" - Jamie
 "The Wall in My Head" – Jamie
 "Spotlight" – Pritti & Year 11 Girls
 "Spotlight (Reprise) (Star of the Show)" – Jamie & Pritti
 "The Legend of Loco Chanelle (and the Blood Red Dress)" – Hugo & the Legs Eleven Girls
 "The Legend of Loco Chanelle (and the Blood Red Dress)" (Reprise) – Hugo
 "If I Met Myself Again" – Margaret
 "Work of Art" – Miss Hedge, Jamie, Dean & Year 11
 "Over the Top" – Hugo & the Legs Eleven Girls

Act Two
 "Everybody's Talking About Jamie" – Year 11
 "Limited Edition Prom Night Special" – Jamie, Ray & Margaret
 "It Means Beautiful" – Pritti
 "It Means Beautiful" (Reprise) – Pritti
 "Ugly in This Ugly World" – Jamie
 "He's My Boy" – Margaret
 "And You Don't Even Know It" (Bus Station Reprise) – Jamie
 "My Man, Your Boy" – Jamie & Margaret
 "The Prom Song" – Year 11
 "Finale" – Company
 "Out of the Darkness (A Place Where We Belong)" – Company

Orchestration 
Dan Gillepsie-Sells originally orchestrated the musical for: 

 Piano-Conductor (keyboard 1)
 Bass/Synth bass
 Guitar/Keys 2/Mandolin 
 Tenor Saxophone
 Trumpet/Flugelhorn/Piccolo
 Trombone † 
 Percussion
 Drums

† For the UK tour production, a reduced orchestration was created, moving from 8-piece band to a 7-piece, with the trombone part being removed.

Recordings

Concept album (2017)
An album titled Everybody's Talking About Jamie (The Concept Album) was released on 15 February 2017 by Wilton Way Records, featuring John McCrea from the Sheffield production. It also included vocals from Sophie Ellis-Bextor, Betty Boo, Dan Gillespie Sells, and Josie Walker.

Original West End cast album (2018)

On 27 April 2018, Everybody's Talking About Jamie (Original West End Cast Recording), featuring all West End cast members and tracks from the musical, became available to purchase in CD and online through Broadway Records.

Productions

Sheffield and West End (2017–2021) 
The musical premiered at the Crucible Theatre, Sheffield on 13 February 2017, following previews from 8 February, it finished its short run on 25 February, directed by Jonathan Butterell. The musical transferred to the West End at the Apollo Theatre from 6 November 2017 with most of the Crucible Theatre cast returning.

The show went on hiatus on 17 March 2020 as a consequence of the COVID-19 pandemic. The show returned on 12 December 2020, with social distancing measures being implemented on the audience. The show closed just four days later. The show reopened with social distancing measures still in place on 20 May 2021. The show went on a break from 26 September 2021.

UK tour (2020–2022) 
A UK tour began from 8 February 2020, opening at the Lyceum Theatre, Sheffield starring Layton Williams and Shane Richie reprising their roles of Jamie and Hugo/Loco Chanelle from the West End production. However, in March 2020 due to the COVID-19 pandemic the tour was forced to stop.

In May 2021, It was announced the tour would recommence in Salford at The Lowry on 1 September 2021. Bianca Del Rio played the role of Loco Chanelle at certain venues.

Seoul (2020) 
The Korean production opened at the LG Arts Centre in Seoul from 4 July to 11 September 2020. 
Four actors; 2AM's Jo Kwon, NU'EST's Ren, Astro's MJ, and musical theatre actor Shin Joo-hyup shared the role of Jamie.

Japan (2021) 
The Japanese production was announced in February 2021. It was announced that the musical will be shown in three cities: Tokyo (July 8 - August 29, Brillia HALL), Osaka (September 4–12, Shin Kabukiza) and Aichi (September 25 and 26, Aichi Prefectural Art Theater). Due to new COVID restrictions in Tokyo the premiere was delayed to August 8. The cast features Win Morisaki and Fu Takahashi as Jamie New. The cast also features long established performers, such as Zen Ishikawa as Hugo, Chizu Hosaka as Ray, Kiyotaka Imai as Jamie's dad and Sandra Bollock and Keigo Yoshino as Laika Virgin.

Los Angeles (2022) 
The musical made its American premiere at the Ahmanson Theatre in Los Angeles from 16 January to 20 February 2022. Layton Williams and Bianca Del Rio reprised their roles as Jamie New and Hugo/Loco Chanelle respectively.

Australian tour (TBA) 
The show was scheduled to embark on an Australian tour from 18 July 2020, at the Sydney Opera House before touring to Sydney Coliseum Theatre (4 to 13 September), The Art House Wyong (1 to 4 October), Arts Centre Melbourne (9 to 25 October), Queensland Performing Arts Centre, Brisbane (13 to 29 November), Canberra Theatre Centre (11 to 13 December), His Majesty's Theatre, Perth (22 to 31 January 2021) and Her Majesty's Theatre, Adelaide (5 to 14 February). However, due to the COVID-19 pandemic, the tour was cancelled.

Italy (2022 - 2023) 
The Italian production was announced in 2020. The debut will take place in 2022 in Rome at the Brancaccio Theater. The first Italian Tour will take place in 2023.

UK tour (2023–2024) 
It was announced in June 2022 that the production will tour the UK again in 2023 and 2024.

Critical reception 
The musical received generally positive reviews.

Ann Treneman of The Times, commenting after its West End run had been confirmed, exclaimed "I gave it a very rare five stars. The moment it ended the entire audience rose up as one. I think that it has such an impact for the same reason that Dear Evan Hansen, the musical that just cleaned up the Tony Awards in New York City, is such a success." Later stating that "This is hit material and it so deserved a chance to strut its stuff in Shaftesbury Avenue. Now it's got it."

Clare Brennan of The Observer stated that "the drama lacks oomph but sheer exuberance carries this coming-of-age tale...That said, this is still a touching, funny and joyous production." Dominic Cavendish, in his four-star review in The Daily Telegraph, stated "I can't think of a musical that has set me spinning right round (like a record, baby) quite as much as this funny, outrageous, touching but oh-my-word PC flag-waving show...The show sends you out on a feel-good bubble of happiness. Think about it too much, though, and the bubble gets pricked."

Mark Shenton of The Stage thought highly of the show, commenting "Everybody should soon be talking about Everybody's Talking About Jamie. This new British musical is by turns courageous and outrageous."

Awards and nominations

Original West End production

Live stage filming
On 5 July 2018, the musical was broadcast live in cinemas across the United Kingdom and Ireland. It later screened in Australia.

Film adaptation

In May 2018, it was announced that the musical would be adapted into a feature film. In June 2019, it was announced that the film would be distributed by 20th Century Fox, which would then be acquired by The Walt Disney Company in 2019. After several delays, it was scheduled to be released on 26 February 2021 before it was cancelled and sold the distribution rights (excluding China) to Amazon Studios and scheduled to be released on Amazon Prime Video on 17 September 2021.
Film cast includes Max Harwood as Jamie; Sarah Lancashire as Margaret; Richard E. Grant as Hugo and Shobna Gulati as Ray. Others in the film cast include Lauren Patel; Layton Williams; Sharon Horgan; Ralph Ineson; John McCrea ; Samuel Bottomley; Lewis & James Sharp (The Sharp Twins); Ramzan Miah; Zane Alsaroori and Noah Leggott. It was nominated for the BAFTA Award for Outstanding British Film at the 75th British Academy Film Awards.

References

External links
Crucible Theatre Listing
 
Official website (London and UK tour)
Official website (Australia)

2017 musicals
Drag (clothing)-related musicals
British musicals
Musicals inspired by real-life events
West End musicals
Teen musicals
Musicals based on films